Dmytro Oseledets (born 23 November 1994) is a Ukrainian swimmer. He competed in the men's 200 metre breaststroke event at the 2016 Summer Olympics.

References

1994 births
Living people
Ukrainian male breaststroke swimmers
Olympic swimmers of Ukraine
Swimmers at the 2016 Summer Olympics
Place of birth missing (living people)